A-YA (A-JA), Cyrillic: a-Я — журнал неофициального русского искусства (English:  Magazine of Unofficial Russian Art), was an underground Russian art revue.  A-YA was illegally prepared in the Soviet Union and then published in Paris from 1979 to 1986.

The editors were Alexander Sidorov (under the pseudonym "Alexej Alexejev") in Moscow and Igor Shelkovsky in Paris. A-YA was distributed in the U.S. by Alexander Kosolapov in New York.  It consisted of 60 pages in A4 format.  There were 3000 copies per edition (the first edition numbered 7000).  A-YA was printed in both color and black and white.

An informal magazine, A-YA opened to the world the virtually unknown-to-the-public contemporary Soviet art and current Russian art, which for many years was to dominate the world's leading exhibition venues and auctions.  It was from A-YA that people first heard the names Eric Bulatov, Ilya Kabakov, Dmitry Prigov and many others.

In 2004, the entire run was reprinted as one volume by ArtChronika with a new forward by Shelkovsky as A-YA - Unofficial Russian Art Review: 1979-1986.

External links 

New York Times
Time magazine
Sotheby's Auctions Calendar

Annual magazines
Magazines published in the Soviet Union
Magazines established in 1979
Magazines disestablished in 1986
Magazines published in Moscow
Magazines published in Paris
Visual arts magazines published in Russia
Russian-language magazines